The 1979–80 season was the 100th season of competitive football by Rangers.

Overview
Rangers played a total of 52 competitive matches during the 1979–80 season. Rangers finished an embarrassing fifth in the league, eleven points behind champions Aberdeen. The main cause for such a poor showing in the league was pointed at the team's away form, only ten points from eighteen matches.

Aberdeen also knocked Rangers out of the Scottish League Cup over a two-legged third round tie. Rangers did reach the 1980 Scottish Cup Final only to lose out to Old Firm rivals Celtic, 1-0 thanks to a deflected George McCluskey shot in extra time. The European Cup Winner's Cup campaign was ended by the eventual winners Valencia CF after having seen off Lillestrøm SK and Fortuna Düsseldorf in previous rounds.

Results
All results are written with Rangers' score first.

Scottish Premier Division

Cup Winners' Cup

Scottish Cup

League Cup

Non-competitive

Drybrough Cup

Tennent Caledonian Cup

Glasgow Cup

✝Competition not completed

Appearances

League table

See also
 1979–80 in Scottish football
 1979–80 Scottish Cup
 1979–80 Scottish League Cup
 1979–80 European Cup Winners' Cup

References 

Rangers F.C. seasons
Rangers